The following is a list of Brachyscome species accepted by the Australian Plant Census as at December 2020:
Brachyscome aculeata (Labill.) Less. – hill daisy (Qld, N.S.W., A.C.T., Vic., Tas.)  
Brachyscome ascendens G.L.Davis (Qld, N.S.W.)
Brachyscome barkerae P.S.Short (N.S.W., Vic.)
Brachyscome basaltica F.Muell. – swamp daisy (S,A., Qld., N.S.W., Vic.)
Brachyscome bellidioides Steetz (W.A.)
Brachyscome billabongensis P.S.Short (W.A.)
Brachyscome blackii G.L.Davis (W.A., N.T., S.A.)
Brachyscome breviscapis C.R.Carter (S.A.) 
Brachyscome brownii P.S.Short (N.S.W.)
Brachyscome campylocarpa J.M.Black (S.A., Qld.)
Brachyscome casstiana P.S.Short (N.S.W., Qld.)
Brachyscome chrysoglossa F.Muell. – yellow-tongue daisy (N.S.W., Vic.)
Brachyscome ciliaris (Labill.) Less. – variable daisy (W.A., N.T., S.A., Qld, N.S.W., Vic., Tas.) 
Brachyscome cuneifolia Tate (S.A., Vic.)
Brachyscome curvicarpa G.L.Davis (Qld., N.S.W.)
Brachyscome dalbyensis P.S.Short (Qld., N.S.W.)
Brachyscome debilis Sond. – weak daisy (S.A., N.S.W., Vic.)
Brachyscome decipiens Hook.f. – field daisy (S.A., N.S.W., A.C.T., Vic., Tas.)
Brachyscome dentata Gaudich. (S.A., Qld., N.S.W., Vic., A.C.T.)
Brachyscome dichromosomatica C.R.Carter (S.A., N.S.W., Vic.)
Brachyscome dissectifolia G.L.Davis (N.S.W.)
Brachyscome diversifolia (Graham ex Hook.) Fisch. & C.A.Mey. – large-headed daisy (S.A., N.S.W., A.C.T., Tas.)
Brachyscome eriogona (J.M.Black) G.L.Davis (S.A., Qld., N.S.W.)
Brachyscome exilis Sond. – slender daisy (W.A., S.A., N.S.W., Vic.)
Brachyscome eyrensis J.H.Willis ex G.L.R.Davis (W.A.)
Brachyscome foliosa P.S.Short (N.S.W., Vic.)
Brachyscome formosa P.S.Short – Pilliga daisy (N.S.W.)
Brachyscome georginensis P.S.Short – Pilliga daisy (Qld.)
Brachyscome gilesii P.S.Short – (N.T., S.A., Qld.)
Brachyscome glandulosa (Steetz) Benth. (W.A.)
Brachyscome goniocarpa Sond. & F. Muell. – dwarf daisy (W.A., S.A., Vic.) 
Brachyscome gracilis G.L.Davis – dookie daisy (N.S.W., Vic.)
Brachyscome graminea (Labill.) F.Muell. (S.A., N.S.W., A.C.T., Vic., Tas.)
Brachyscome iberidifolia Benth. (W.A., N.T.)
Brachyscome kaputarensis P.S.Short – (N.S.W.)
Brachyscome lineariloba (DC.) Druce – hard-headed daisy (W.A., S.A., Qld., N.S.W., Vic.)
Brachyscome melanocarpa Sond. & F. Muell. – black-seeded daisy (S.A., Qld., N.S.W.) 
Brachyscome microcarpa F.Muell. (Qld., N.S.W.)
Brachyscome mittagongensis P.S.Short (N.S.W.)
Brachyscome muelleri Sond. (S.A.)
Brachyscome muelleroides G.L.Davis – Mueller daisy (N.S.W., Vic.)
Brachyscome multifida DC. – cut-leaved daisy (Qld., N.S.W., Vic.)
Brachyscome nivalis F.Muell. – snow daisy (N.S.W., A.C.T., Vic.)
Brachyscome nodosa P.S.Short & Watan. (Qld., N.S.W.)
Brachyscome nova-anglica G.L.Davis (Qld., N.S.W.)
Brachyscome obovata G.L.Davis (N.S.W., A.C.T., Vic.)
Brachyscome paludicola P.S.Short (S.A., Qld., N.S.W., Vic.)
Brachyscome papillosa G.L.Davis – Mossgiel daisy (N.S.W.)
Brachyscome parvula Hook.f. (S.A., Vic., Tas.)
Brachyscome perpusilla (Steetz) J.M.Black – tiny daisy (W.A., S.A., N.S.W., Vic., Tas.)
Brachyscome petrophila G.L.Davis (N.S.W., Vic.)
Brachyscome procumbens G.L.Davis (N.S.W.)
Brachyscome ptychocarpa F.Muell. (N.S.W., Vic.)
Brachyscome pusilla Steetz (W.A.)
Brachyscome radicans Steetz (N.S.W., A.C.T., Vic., Tas.)
Brachyscome radicata Hook.f. (Tas.)
Brachyscome rara G.L.Davis (S.A., Qld.)
Brachyscome readeri G.L.Davis – southern daisy (S.A., N.S.W., Vic.)
Brachyscome rigidula (DC.) G.L.Davis – hairy cut-leaf daisy, cut-leaf daisy (Qld., N.S.W., A.C.T., Vic., Tas.) 
Brachyscome riparia G.L.Davis (Vic.)
Brachyscome rudallensis P.S.Short (W.A.)
Brachyscome salkiniae P.S.Short (N.S.W., Vic.)
Brachyscome scapigera  (Sieber ex Spreng.) DC. – tufted daisy (Qld., N.S.W., A.C.T., Vic.)
Brachyscome segmentosa C.Moore & F.Muell. – Lord Howe Island daisy (L.H.I.)
Brachyscome sieberi DC. (N.S.W.)
Brachyscome simulans P.S.Short (W.A.)
Brachyscome smithwhitei P.S.Short & Watan. (Qld., N.S.W.)
Brachyscome spathulata Gaudich. (N.S.W., Vic., Tas.)
Brachyscome staceae P.S.Short (Qld., N.S.W.)
Brachyscome stolonifera G.L.Davis (N.S.W.)
Brachyscome stuartii Benth. (Qld., N.S.W.)
Brachyscome tadgellii Tovey & P.Morris (Vic.)
Brachyscome tamworthensis P.S.Short (N.S.W.)
Brachyscome tasmanica P.S.Short (Tas.)
Brachyscome tatei J.M.Black (W.A., S.A.) 
Brachyscome tenuiscapa Hook.f. (N.S.W., Tas.)
Brachyscome tesquorum J.M.Black (W.A., N.T., S.A., Qld.)
Brachyscome tetrapterocarpa G.L.Davis (Qld.)
Brachyscome trachycarpa F.Muell. – inland daisy, smooth daisy (W.A., S.A., Qld., N.S.W. Vic.)
Brachyscome triloba Gaudich. (N.S.W.)
Brachyscome trisecta P.S.Short (N.S.W.)
Brachyscome walshii P.S.Short (Vic.)
Brachyscome watanabei P.S.Short (Qld., N.S.W.)
Brachyscome whitei G.L.Davis – spreading daisy (Qld., N.S.W.)
Brachyscome willisii P.S.Short (N.S.W., A.C.T., Vic.)
Brachyscome xanthocarpa D.A.Cooke (S.A.)

References

External links

List
Brachyscome